"Speed of Life" is the first instrumental by David Bowie. It is the opening track for his album Low from 1977.

"Speed of Life" introduces the Low album, and, coupled with the instrumental "A New Career in a New Town", provides a front bookend for the A-side of the album. The track makes several immediate implications about the content of the album, with its heavy use of synthesizers as both effects and instruments, with the presence of Dennis Davis' drums and the overlaid harmonizer creating a distinctly different mix than any previous Bowie album.

The song includes the refrain from Here Comes That Rainy Day Feeling Again.

Lyrics were originally planned for this song, but Bowie abandoned the idea after several attempts, deciding that the piece stood better on its own.

Live versions

 Performances from the Isolar II Tour have been released on Stage (1978) and Welcome to the Blackout (2018). The song was also performed during the 2002 tour, in which Bowie played the Low album in its entirety on selected dates.

Other releases
 It was released as the B-side of the single "Be My Wife" in June 1977.
 It also appeared in the Sound + Vision box set.
 It was released as a picture disc in the RCA Life Time picture disc set.

Production credits

 Producers:
 Tony Visconti
 Musicians:
 David Bowie: ARP synthesizer, Chamberlin
 Carlos Alomar: Guitar
 George Murray: Bass
 Dennis Davis: Drums
 Roy Young: Piano

Cover versions
 ST-37 – Only Bowie (1995)
 Insect Surfers – Ziggy Played Surf Guitar (Various Artists Compilation) (2011)
 Shearwater – as part of a live performance of the entire Berlin Trilogy for WNYC (2018)

Sources
Greatorex, Johnathan. "Just a Mortal With Potential." Teenage Wildlife. Nov. 1996. 6 Mar. 2006 <http://www.teenagewildlife.com/Interact/fc/misc/JG/index.html>.
Griffin, Roger. "Low." Bowie Golden Years. Jan. 2005. 6 Mar. 2006 <http://www.bowiegoldenyears.com/low.html>.
Wilcken, Hugo, Low, Continuum International Publishing Group Inc, 2005,

References

David Bowie songs
1977 songs
Songs written by David Bowie
Rock instrumentals
Song recordings produced by David Bowie
Song recordings produced by Tony Visconti